Extreme Conditions Demand Extreme Responses is the debut full-length album by American grindcore band Brutal Truth, released in September 1992 via Earache Records.

Release
Music videos were made for "Collateral Damage" (which once held the Guinness World Record for the shortest music video) and "Ill Neglect".

In 2010, Earache issued a limited edition redux version on CD, containing the original album along with 11 bonus tracks from the single Ill Neglect and the Perpetual Conversion EP as well as S.O.B. cover songs and music videos.

Reception

In March 2009, Terrorizer named the album the number one American grindcore release.

Track listing

Personnel
Kevin Sharp – vocals, power tools
Brent McCarthy – guitars
Dan Lilker – bass, vocals, sampling
Scott Lewis – drums
Bill Yurkiewicz – guest vocals, noise, animal sounds

Production
Colin Richardson – production
Jim Welch – production
Digby Pearson – executive production
Garris Shipon – engineering
Howie Weinberg – mastering

References

Brutal Truth albums
1992 debut albums
Earache Records albums